Frances Power Cobbe (4 December 1822 – 5 April 1904) was an Anglo-Irish writer, philosopher, religious thinker, social reformer, anti-vivisection activist and leading women's suffrage campaigner. She founded a number of animal advocacy groups, including the National Anti-Vivisection Society (NAVS) in 1875 and the British Union for the Abolition of Vivisection (BUAV) in 1898, and was a member of the executive council of the London National Society for Women's Suffrage.

She was the author of a large number of books and essays, including An Essay on Intuitive Morals (1855), The Pursuits of Women (1863),  Cities of the Past (1864), Essays New and Old on Ethical and Social Subjects (1865), Darwinism in Morals, and other Essays (1872), The Hopes of the Human Race (1874), The Duties of Women (1881), The Peak in Darien, with some other Inquiries touching concerns of the Soul and the Body (1882), The Scientific Spirit of the Age (1888) and The Modern Rack: Papers on Vivisection (1889). She also published dozens of essays in most of the leading heavy-weight periodicals of the time, as well as an autobiography and a substantial amount of more popular journalism.

Life

Frances Power Cobbe was a member of the prominent Cobbe family, descended from Archbishop Charles Cobbe, Primate of Ireland. She was born in Newbridge House in the family estate in present-day Donabate, County Dublin.

Cobbe worked at the Red Lodge Reformatory and lived with the owner, Mary Carpenter, from 1858 to 1859, but a turbulent relationship between the two meant that Cobbe left the school and moved out.

Cobbe formed a lesbian relationship with Welsh sculptor Mary Lloyd (1819-1896), whom she met in Rome in 1861, and with whom she lived from 1864 until Lloyd's death in 1896. The death affected Cobbe badly. Her friend, writer Blanche Atkinson, wrote, “The sorrow of Miss Lloyd’s death changed the whole aspect of existence for Miss Cobbe. The joy of life had gone. It had been such a friendship as is rarely seen – perfect in love, sympathy, and mutual understand.”  

Around 1891, in danger of losing their home at Hengwrt, in which Lloyd had inherited a share upon the death of her parents, the couple was relieved by a legacy of over £25,000 from the widow of Richard Vaughan Yates. 

They are buried together at Saint Illtyd Church Cemetery, Llanelltyd, Gwynedd, Wales.  In letters and published writing, Cobbe referred to Lloyd alternately as "husband," "wife," and "dear friend."

Cobbe founded the Society for the Protection of Animals Liable to Vivisection (SPALV) in 1875, the world's first organisation campaigning against animal experiments, and in 1898 the BUAV, two groups that remain active. She was a member of the executive council of the London National Society for Women's Suffrage and writer of editorial columns for London newspapers on suffrage, property rights for women and opposition to vivisection. Around 1880, with Louise Twining, she founded Homes for Workhouse Girls.

Cobbe met the Darwin family in 1868. Emma Darwin liked her, "Miss Cobbe was very agreeable." Cobbe persuaded Charles Darwin to read Immanuel Kant's Metaphysics of Ethics. She met him again during 1869 in Wales, and apparently interrupted him when he was quite ill, and tried to persuade him to read John Stuart Mill—and indeed Darwin had read Cobbe's review of Mill's book, The Subjection of Women. She then lost his trust when without permission she edited and published a letter he had written to her.

Her critique of Darwin's Descent of Man, Darwinism in Morals was published in The Theological Review in April 1871.

In philosophy, Cobbe was a proponent of intuitionism in ethics. She thought that morality and religion were inseparably connected: moral obligations depend on a moral law, which requires a divine legislator. She was an opponent of utilitarianism. Her philosophical views were wide-ranging and she addressed a huge range of philosophical topics including the nature of action and moral knowledge, aesthetics, philosophy of mind, philosophy of religion, history, pessimism, the possibility of life after death, and many more. Her philosophical contribution is now beginning to be rediscovered as part of the recovery of women in the history of philosophy.

Cobbe's activism for women's rights included advocating for women to be allowed not only to attend university but also to take university examinations, follow the same curricula as men and held to the same academic standards, and graduate with degrees. She presented an influential paper at the Social Science Congress in 1862 to argue the case

Legacy
A portrait of her is included in a mural by Walter P. Starmer unveiled in 1921 in the church of St Jude-on-the-Hill in Hampstead Garden Suburb, London.

Her name and picture (and those of 58 other women's suffrage supporters) are on the plinth of the statue of Millicent Fawcett in Parliament Square, London, unveiled in 2018.

Her name is listed on the south face of the Reformers Memorial in Kensal Green Cemetery in London.

The Animal Theology professorship at the Graduate Theological Foundation is named after Cobbe.

See also
Brown Dog affair
Lizzy Lind af Hageby
Caroline Earle White
 List of animal rights advocates
Women and animal advocacy

References

Further reading
Frances Power Cobbe, The Modern Rack: Papers on Vivisection. London: Swan Sonnenschein, 1889.
Buettinger, Craig. "Women and antivivisection in late nineteenth century America", Journal of Social History, Vol. 30, No. 4 (Summer, 1997), pp. 857–872.
Caine, Barbara. Victorian feminists. Oxford 1992
Hamilton, Susan. Frances Power Cobbe and Victorian Feminism. Palgrave Macmillan, 2006.
Mitchell, Sally. Frances Power Cobbe: Victorian Feminist, Journalist, Reformer. University of Virginia Press, 2004.
Rakow, Lana and Kramarae, Cheris. The Revolution in Words: Women's Source Library. London, Routledge 2003 
Stone, Alison. Entries on Cobbe's philosophical thought, Encyclopedia of Concise Concepts by Women in Philosophy Encyclopedia of Concise Concepts by Women Philosophers - History Of Women Philosophers
Stone, Alison (2022). Frances Power Cobbe. Cambridge University Press. 
Lori Williamson, Power and protest : Frances Power Cobbe and Victorian society. 2005. . A 320-page biography.
Victorian feminist, social reformer and anti-vivisectionist, discussion on BBC Radio 4's Woman's Hour, 27 June 2005
State University of New York – Frances Power Cobbe (1822–1904)
The archives of the British Union for the Abolition of Vivisection (ref U DBV) are held at the Hull History Centre. Details of holdings are on its online catalogue.

External links

 
 
 

Frances Power Cobbe archives at the National Library of Wales

Frances
1822 births
1904 deaths
Anti-vivisectionists
Feminist writers
Irish animal rights activists
Irish feminists
Irish non-fiction writers
Irish women non-fiction writers
Irish suffragists
Irish LGBT writers
LGBT feminists
LGBT philosophers
Lesbian writers
Non-Darwinian evolution
People from Fingal
Women of the Victorian era
Irish women writers
British social reformers
British women philosophers
British philosophers
Irish women's rights activists
19th-century women writers
Irish women philosophers
19th-century Irish philosophers